Austrolycopodium fastigiatum, synonym Lycopodium fastigiatum, commonly known as alpine club moss or mountain club moss, is a species of club moss native to New Zealand and Australia. The genus Austrolycopodium is accepted in the Pteridophyte Phylogeny Group classification of 2016 (PPG I), but not in other classifications which submerge the genus in Lycopodium. 

It is widespread across New Zealand including Stewart, Chatham, Adams, Auckland, and Campbell Islands. It has also been found in the Australian States of Tasmania, Victoria, and New South Wales. It grows in mountainous, alpine areas to scrubland. In cold conditions it can have a bright orange appearance.

References

Lycopodiaceae
Flora of New Zealand
Flora of Australia
Plants described in 1810